The concept of quiet and loud aliens is used in the modelling of hypotheses for the prevalence of extraterrestrial intelligence, particularly in the context of the Fermi Paradox. Hypothetical "loud" aliens expand their sphere of influence rapidly in a highly detectable way; hypothetical "quiet" aliens are hard or impossible to detect. A special case of loud alien civilizations are "grabby aliens" who also inhibit the development of other technological civilizations in their sphere of influence.

References

See also 
 Fermi paradox
 Search for extraterrestrial intelligence
 Anthropic principle

Fermi paradox
Astrobiology
Search for extraterrestrial intelligence